Johann Mattheson (28 September 1681 – 17 April 1764) was a German composer, singer, writer, lexicographer, diplomat and music theorist.

Early life and career 
The son of a prosperous tax collector, Mattheson received a broad liberal education and, aside from general musical training, took lessons in keyboard instruments, violin, composition and singing. By age nine he was singing and playing organ in church and was a member of the chorus of the Hamburg opera. He made his solo debut with the Hamburg opera in 1696 in female roles and, after his voice changed, sang tenor at the opera, conducted rehearsals and composed operas himself. He was cantor at St. Mary's Cathedral from 1718 until increasing deafness led to his retirement from that post in 1728.

Mattheson's chief occupation from 1706 was as a professional diplomat. He had studied English in school and spoke it fluently. He became tutor to the son of the English ambassador Sir John Wich and then secretary to the ambassador. He went on diplomatic missions abroad representing the ambassador. In 1709 he married Catharina Jennings, the daughter of an English clergyman; their marriage was without issue.

Friendship with Handel 
Mattheson was a close friend of George Frideric Handel, although he nearly killed Handel in a sudden quarrel, during a performance of Mattheson's opera Cleopatra in 1704. Handel was saved only by a large button which turned aside Mattheson's sword. The two were afterwards reconciled and remained in correspondence for life: shortly after his friend's death, Mattheson translated John Mainwaring's biography of Handel into German and had it published in Hamburg at his own expense ("auf Kosten des Übersetzers") in 1761.

Literary and musical legacy 

Mattheson is mainly famous as a music theorist. He was the most abundant writer on performance practice, theatrical style, and harmony of the German Baroque. He is particularly important for his work on the relationship of the disciplines of rhetoric and music, for example in Das neu-eröffnete Orchestre and Der vollkommene Capellmeister. However his books raise more and more attention and suspicion because Mattheson was a brilliant polemist and his theories on music are often full of pedantry and pseudo-erudition.

The bulk of his compositional output was vocal, including eight operas, and numerous oratorios and cantatas. He also wrote a few sonatas and some keyboard music, including pieces meant for keyboard instruction. All of his music, except for one opera, one oratorio, and a few collections of instrumental music, went missing after World War II, but was given back to Hamburg from Yerevan,  Armenia, in 1998. This includes four operas and most of the oratorios. The manuscripts are now located at the Staats- und Universitätsbibliothek Hamburg, the former Hamburg Stadtbibliothek (City Library).

Selected works

Operas
Cleopatra
Boris Goudenow

Oratorios
"Das größte Kind", Weihnachtsoratorium
"Die heilsame Geburt", Weihnachtsoratorium
Joseph, Oratorium, 1727
Der liebreiche und geduldige David

Death 
After his death in 1764, Johann Mattheson was buried in the vault of Hamburg's St. Michaelis' Church where his grave can be visited.

See also
Doctrine of the affections
Letters and writings of George Frideric Handel

Notes

References 
"Johann Mattheson", "Rhetoric and music" from The New Grove Dictionary of Music and Musicians, ed. Stanley Sadie. 20 vol. London, Macmillan Publishers Ltd., 1980. 
Manfred Bukofzer, Music in the Baroque Era. New York, W.W. Norton & Co., 1947.

Further reading
Stubbs, Stephen. "Johann Mattheson—the Russian Connection: The Rediscovery of Boris Goudenow and His Other Lost Operas". Early Music 33, no. 2 (May 2005): 283–92.

External links
: music and books.

1681 births
1764 deaths
18th-century classical composers
18th-century German composers
18th-century German male musicians
18th-century German writers
18th-century German male writers
German Baroque composers
German male classical composers
German opera composers
German music theorists
German lexicographers
German diplomats
German duellists
German male non-fiction writers
Male opera composers
Musicians from Hamburg
Writers from Hamburg
Deaf classical musicians
German deaf people
18th-century lexicographers